The Acme Giants were a baseball team that played in the Iron and Oil League. They were founded by businessman Harry Curtis in 1898, in Celoron, New York, in the southwestern part of the state. The team's initial incarnation was as the Acme Colored Giants, and were a team consisting solely of black players. This made them unique in their league, which otherwise consisted of all white teams. Curtis boasted that "we will have the strongest colored team in America" when he started the team. After the team won only 8 of their first 49 games, however, Curtis disbanded the team. This new team, the Acme Giants, with the word "Colored" removed, consisted of only white players.

References
Loverro, Thom. The Encyclopedia of Negro League Baseball. New York:Facts on File, Inc., 2003. .

Defunct baseball teams in New York (state)
Negro league baseball teams
Chautauqua County, New York
Professional baseball teams in New York (state)
Baseball teams established in 1898
Baseball teams disestablished in 1898
Iron and Oil League teams